Minuscule 565 (in the Gregory-Aland numbering), ε 93 (Soden), also known as the Empress Theodora's Codex, is a Greek minuscule manuscript of the New Testament, written on purple parchment, dated palaeographically to the 9th century. It was labelled by Scrivener as 473.
The manuscript is lacunose. It has marginalia.

Description 

The codex is one of only two known purple minuscules (minuscule 1143 is the other), written with gold ink. It contains the text of the four Gospels on 405 purple parchment leaves (17.6 by 19.2 cm), with some lacunae (Matthew 20:18-26, 21:45-22:9, Luke 10:36-11:2, 18:25-37, 20:24-26, John 11:26-48, 13:2-23, 17:1-12). The text is written in one column per page, 17 lines per page.

There is also a division according to the Ammonian Sections. There are no references to the Eusebian Canons.

It contains the Eusebian tables, which were added by later hand. It has the famous Jerusalem Colophon.

The manuscript is similar to Beratinus 2 (Minuscule 1143).

Text 

The Greek text of the codex has been considered a representative of the so-called Caesarean text-type. Aland placed it in Category III. In the Gospel of Mark, this manuscript is closely aligned to Codex Koridethi. According to Aland, the quality of the text is higher in the Gospel of Mark, however lower in Matthew and Luke. Minuscule 565 is considered a member of Family 1 in the Gospel of John.

According to the Claremont Profile Method it represents the Alexandrian text in Luke 1 and Kx in Luke 10 and Luke 20.

In  it lacks , a reading supported by the manuscripts  A B K M N S U Y Δ Θ Π Ψ Ω 047 0141 8 9 1192.

It lacks the Pericope Adulterae (John 7:53-8:1), with an explanatory note.

History 

The manuscript is dated by the INTF to the 9th century.

The manuscript comes from the area of the Black Sea, in Pontus.
In 1829 it was brought to Saint Petersburg. The manuscript was examined and described by Eduard de Muralt, along with the codices 566, 568-572, 574, 575, and 1567. The text of Mark was edited in 1885 by Johannes Engebretsen Belsheim.

The codex now is located at the Russian National Library (Gr. 53) at Saint Petersburg.

See also 
 List of New Testament minuscules
 Purple parchment
 Textual criticism

References

Further reading 
 
 
 .

External links 

 
 
 Ф. № 906 (Gr.) 053 (Granstrem 81) Pinakes

Purple parchment
Greek New Testament minuscules
9th-century biblical manuscripts
National Library of Russia collection